Charles McNider (the original Doctor Mid-Nite and a bearer of the name Starman) is a fictional superhero in DC Comics. The character appeared for the first time in All-American Comics #25 (April 1941).

Like many Golden Age heroic characters, the original Doctor Mid-Nite appeared as a member of DC's Justice Society of America.

As a blind character, Doctor Mid-Nite is widely regarded as the first superhero in comics to exhibit a physical impairment, pre-dating the creation of Daredevil of Marvel Comics by more than twenty years.

Dr. Mid-Nite made his live appearance on the second season of DC's Legends of Tomorrow played by Kwesi Ameyaw. Doctor Mid-Nite appeared in the first episode of the first season of the DC Universe series Stargirl portrayed by Henry Thomas in season one and by Alex Collins in seasons two and three. Thomas and Collins also voiced the goggles that the new Dr. Mid-Nite Beth Chapel acquires.

Fictional character biography
Charles McNider is a surgeon who was called one night to remove a bullet from a witness set to testify against mobsters. A mobster named "Killer" Maroni threw a grenade into the room, killing the witness and blinding McNider, with the injury causing him to believe his career as a surgeon was over. One evening, as he was recovering, an owl crashed through his window. Removing the bandages covering his eyes, McNider discovered that he could still see, but only in perfect darkness. McNider developed a special visor allowing him to see in the light and "blackout bombs" capable of blocking out all light, becoming a costumed crime fighter. He adopted the owl, naming it 'Hooty', and it became his sidekick. Upon becoming Doctor Mid-Nite, his first outing had him bringing "Killer" Maroni to justice.

He later joined the Justice Society of America (JSA) and the All-Star Squadron. In 1942, McNider enlisted in the U.S. Medical Corps as a physician during World War II, rising to the rank of captain. Ten years after his debut, McNider briefly assumed the role of Starman after the JSA disbanded when Ted Knight, the original Starman, had a nervous breakdown as a result of his participation in the development of the atomic bomb.

According to Jess Nevins' Encyclopedia of Golden Age Superheroes, "his opponents include the minstrel the Baleful Banshee, the hypnosis-wielding Doctor Light, the angling-themed Fisherman, and the gang lord Tarantula".

McNider suffered a devastating event in 1953, when the woman he loved, Myra Mason, was murdered by the Shadower, a foe who had learned Doctor Mid-Nite's secret identity.  McNider's later romantic history is unrevealed, but another "old friend" of McNider, Miss Alice King, made an appearance in All-American Comics #90 (October 1947). McNider apparently had no children, but at one point McNider rescued a pregnant woman from attack in Sogndal, Norway and delivered her baby, Pieter Cross, who later became the third Doctor Mid-Nite. McNider was also one of the JSA members captured and placed in suspended animation by the Immortal villain Vandal Savage, before being freed by the Flash.

Charles McNider eventually met his end as one of the casualties of Zero Hour, when he and fellow JSA member Hourman were aged to death by Extant. He was briefly reanimated as a member of the Black Lantern Corps during the Blackest Night event, only to be destroyed by Mr. Terrific.

Powers, equipment, and abilities
McNider possesses the metahuman ability to see perfectly in the dark. Utilizing special infrared lenses, McNider can see in light; later in his life, his lenses become more ineffective as his eyesight continues to deteriorate even further, inhibiting his daylight vision. McNider also employs "blackout bombs" which release pitch-black gas that blinds villains yet allowing McNider to see. For a time, he used a weapon called a "cryotuber" which can either control the nervous system of an opponent or fire bursts of heat or cold. He is also a brilliant doctor and a mathematician. In All-Star Comics #13, he is able to communicate with a Neptunian using mathematical equations. As Starman, McNider uses various star-themed gadgets, including an airship designed by the Red Torpedo. McNider is also a superb athlete and fighter, as well as a gifted physician and author.

Other versions
 In Kingdom Come, Alex Ross portrays Doctor Mid-Nite (known here simply as Midnight) as a disembodied cowl amid thick black smoke reminiscent of his "blackout bombs". The wraith is said to be the vengeful spirit of Dr. Charles McNider.
 Another version of the character was shown in Dan Jolley and Tony Harris' JSA: The Liberty File as a World War II-era United States intelligence agent code-named the Owl. This character, though presented as a rich playboy, resembles other versions of Doctor Mid-Nite. Though derided for his dalliances with the ladies, McNider was trusted as a valued field operative.
 In the Elseworlds novel Batman: Holy Terror - set in a world where Oliver Cromwell lived long enough to extend his rule to America, which is now run by a corrupt theocracy - Doctor Charles McNider was a friend of Thomas and Martha Wayne before their deaths, losing his eyes and his wife for his defiance of the state. When Bruce comes to visit him, he warns Bruce against fighting the system, but also confirms that the Waynes were killed by the ruling Privy Council for providing medical services to those the council has deemed undesirable, such as Jews or homosexuals.

Collected editions
The original Dr. Mid-Nite (Charles McNider) is one of seven JSA-related heroes whose solo appearances are collected in an anthology entry in the DC Archive Editions series:

In other media

Television
 Charles McNider as Doctor Mid-Nite makes non-speaking cameo appearances in Justice League Unlimited as a member of the eponymous team.
 Charles McNider as Doctor Mid-Nite appears in Batman: The Brave and the Bold, voiced by Corey Burton. This version is a member and resident doctor of the Justice Society of America (JSA).
 Charles McNider as Doctor Mid-Nite appears in the Mad segment "That's What Super Friends Are For", voiced by Kevin Shinick.
 Charles McNider as Doctor Mid-Nite appears in the second season of Legends of Tomorrow, portrayed by Kwesi Ameyaw. This version is a legally blind member of the Justice Society of America, who were active in the 1940s until mos of them went missing following a mission in 1940. In reality, they scattered themselves across time to protect the Spear of Destiny, with McNider going to the year 3000, where he became a researcher and used futuristic technology to restore his sight. However, he is killed by a brainwashed Rip Hunter, who steals the fragment for the Legion of Doom. 
 Charles McNider as Doctor Mid-Nite appears in Stargirl, portrayed by Henry Thomas in season one and by Alex Collins in season two. This version is a member of the Justice Society of America (JSA) who sports longevity and wears special glasses that can sync with special goggles he developed and programmed with an A.I. modeled after him (also provided by Thomas in season one and by Collins in season two) and memories. In flashbacks, he was with the JSA when the Injustice Society of America (ISA) attacked their headquarters. During the battle, Shade pretended to attack McNider to save him, but accidentally lost him in the Shadowlands, leading to the latter being presumed dead. In the present, Beth Chapel assumes the mantle of Doctor Mid-Nite after she discovers McNider's googles. In season two, McNider eventually makes contact with Chapel and later encounters Courtney Whitmore and Cindy Burman after Eclipso sent them to the Shadowlands. Once Shade uses his abilities to free the trio, McNider and Chapel work to find Eclipso so their allies can defeat him. Afterward, McNider gives Chapel his blessing to continue operating as Doctor Mid-Nite before she informs him that his wife has settled in Melody Hills, where she now has a son.

Miscellaneous
Charles McNider as Doctor Mid-Nite appears in issue #40 of the Injustice 2 prequel comic. This version isolated himself to Norway, with Ted Grant being the only one who knows of them. Grant brings Batman to McNider to recruit the latter in performing a heart transplant on Superboy using General Zod's heart so the former can leave the Phantom Zone.

Merchandise
 Charles McNider as Doctor Mid-Nite and Hooty received an action figure in wave twelve of the DC Universe Classics line. Additionally, his pet owl, Hooty, appeared as an accessory.
 Charles McNider as Doctor Mid-Nite and Hooty received an action figure from DC Direct in 2001.
 The Justice League Unlimited incarnation of Charles McNider / Doctor Mid-Nite received an action figure in Mattel's Justice League Unlimited toy line in November 2011.

References

External links
 JSA Fact File: Doctor Mid-Nite I
 Doctor Mid-Nite at Don Markstein's Toonopedia. Archived from the original on April 4, 2016.

All-American Publications characters
Characters created by Roy Thomas
Characters created by Todd McFarlane
Comics characters introduced in 1941
DC Comics male superheroes
DC Comics martial artists
DC Comics metahumans
DC Comics titles
Earth-Two
Fictional characters from parallel universes
Fictional blind characters
Fictional physicians
Fictional surgeons
Golden Age superheroes
Starman (DC Comics)